A Treatise on Crimes and Misdemeanours or Russell on Crime is a book originally written by William Oldnall Russell. For the purpose of citation, its name may be abbreviated to Russ Cr.

Russell's Treatise on Crimes and Misdemeanours, which appeared in 1819 in two volumes in octavo, was pronounced by Warren (Law Student, 2nd edit. p. 620) "the best general treatise in criminal law". A second edition appeared in 1827; a third, edited by C. S. Greaves, in 1843, with a supplement in 1851; a fourth, in 3 volumes, in 1865; and a fifth, edited by S. Prentice, Q.C., in 1877. The American editions, of which seven were issued between 1824 and 1853, do not reproduce the whole work.

In 1847, J G Marvin said of the third London and fifth American editions:

The most recent edition of Russell on Crime was the twelfth edition, which was published in 1964.

References
Marke (ed). A Catalogue of the Law Collection at New York University. Law Center of New York University. New York. 1953. Law Book Exchange Ltd. Union, New Jersey. 1999. Page 453.
Linsay Farmer, "Of Treatises and Textbooks" in Fernandez and Dubber (eds). Law Books in Action: Essays on the Anglo-American Legal Treatise. Hart Publishing. Oxford and Portland, Oregon. 2012. Pages 154 to 156.
Lindsay Farmer. Making the Modern Criminal Law. Oxford University Press. 2016. Pages 146 and 147.

Editions
First Edition. London. 1819. vol 2.
First American Edition. 1824. Vols 1 and 2.
Second Edition. London. 1826. Vol 1. 1828. Vol 2.
Third Edition. London. 1843. Vols 1   and 2.
Sixth American Edition. 1850. Vols 1 and 2
Eighth American Edition. 1857. Vols 1 and 2
Fourth Edition (1865) C. S. Greaves
Fifth Edition (1877) S. Prentice
Sixth Edition (1896) Horace Smith and A. P. P. Keep
Seventh Edition (1909) W. F. Craies and L. W. Kershaw 
Eighth Edition (1923) R. E. Ross and G. B. McClure
Ninth Edition  1936) R. E. Ross 
Tenth Edition (1950) J. W. Cecil Turner
Eleventh Edition. 1958, 2 volumes, Stevens & Sons Ltd, 1964.
Twelfth Edition. 1964, 2 volumes, Sweet & Maxwell Ltd, 1964. Google Books

Reviews
Daniel Davis (1825) 20 North American Review 224 JSTOR
(1853) 1 American Law Register 448 JSTOR
W B L (1896) 35 American Law Register and Review (New Series) 679 (Old Series volume 44) JSTOR
P W H (1924) 2 Cambridge Law Journal 126 JSTOR
J W C T (1937) 6 Cambridge Law Journal 281 JSTOR
(1937) 2 University of Toronto Law Journal 200 JSTOR
 A Ll A (1952) 11 Cambridge Law Journal 316 JSTOR
C (1952) 15 Modern Law Review 260 JSTOR
 Francis A Allen (1952) 43 Journal of Criminal Law, Criminology, and Police Science 228 JSTOR
Walter P Armstrong Jr (1959) 45 ABA Journal 194 JSTOR
C (1959) 22 Modern Law Review 708 JSTOR
Rupert Cross (1964) 22 Cambridge Law Journal 286 JSTOR
Richard F Sparks (1965) 28 Modern Law Review 497 JSTOR

Footnotes

1819 non-fiction books
Law books
Treatises
Non-fiction crime books